The Chantels were a pop music group and were the second African-American girl group to enjoy nationwide success in the United States, preceded by The Bobbettes. The group was established in the early 1950s by students attending St. Anthony of Padua Church and school in the Bronx. 

The original five members consisted of Arlene Smith (lead) (October 5, 1941), Sonia Goring Wilson (born Millicent Goring) (1940), Renée Minus White (1943), Jackie Landry Jackson (May 22, 1941 – December 23, 1997) and Lois Harris (1940). They derived their name from that of Jane Frances de Chantal.

Career
In 1957 the Chantels, then in high school, had been singing as a group for several years. Unlike some black groups whose influences were based in gospel, the quintet was influenced by classical music and Latin hymns. Lead singer Arlene Smith had received classical training and performed at Carnegie Hall at age 12. She provided both lyrics and music. The girls were discovered by Richard Barrett, lead singer of the Valentines, and by the summer of 1957 they were signed to End Records, owned by George Goldner. Their first single was "He's Gone" (Pop #71) in August 1957, written by Arlene Smith. Released in December 1957, their second single, "Maybe," was a hit (#15 Billboard Hot 100; #2 R&B chart) in January 1958. It sold over a million copies and was awarded a gold disc. The following releases were less successful but End did release an album originally titled We Are the Chantels. The original cover had a photo of the group. That album was soon withdrawn and repackaged with a picture of two white teenagers picking out a song; the title was shortened to The Chantels.

The group was dropped by End in 1959, and Arlene Smith embarked upon a solo career. Harris left to pursue a college education. That year Chantels singles led by Richard Barrett were released on the End subsidiary label, Gone. In 1960 Annette Smith (no relation to Arlene) replaced Arlene Smith. As a quartet the group moved to Carlton Records, where they had their second huge hit with "Look in My Eyes" (#14 pop, #6 R&B). Other releases on Carlton didn't do as well. One song was "Well I Told You," a response to the Ray Charles song "Hit the Road, Jack which stalled at #29 pop. A Carlton album was released in 1962 titled The Chantels on Tour but featured no live recordings and only seven tracks were recorded by the actual group. The other three tracks were by Gus Backus, Chris Montez and Little Anthony & the Imperials. To cash in on "Look in My Eyes", End threw together an album titled There's Our Song Again, a compilation of previously recorded material.

The Chantels switched record labels a few more times. Although personnel changed throughout the 1960s, the constants in the group were Jackie Landry, Sonia Goring and Renee Minus. This line-up, plus Arlene Smith, recorded a one-off single for RCA in 1970. Smith fronted a new group called Chantels in the 1970s which featured up-and-coming disco diva Carol Douglas and former Gems vocalist Louise Bethune (who would also become a 1970s performing member of the Crystals). Smith continued to perform solo. In 1995 the remaining original Chantels reformed as well and hired Noemi (Ami) Ortiz as their lead singer. On the PBS special Doo Wop 50, Smith reunited with the surviving original members of the Chantels and dedicated "Maybe" to Jackie Landry, who died in 1997.

The Chantels were inducted into the Vocal Group Hall of Fame in 2002. In 2001 they made the final ballot for induction into the Rock and Roll Hall of Fame, but without enough votes for induction. Despite continued appearances since then on Rock and Roll Hall of Fame ballots by 1950s doo-wop groups, the Chantels did not get enough votes to reach any subsequent ballot until September 2009, when it was revealed that they were one of 12 nominees to be inducted to the Hall in 2010.

Discography

Albums
We Are the Chantels (End Records, 1958)
There's Our Song Again (End Records, 1961)
The Chantels on Tour (Carlton Records, 1962)

Singles

References

Bibliography
 Clemente, John (2000). Girl Groups -- Fabulous Females That Rocked The World, Iola, Wisconsin, Krause Publications. p. 276. .
 Clemente, John (2013). Girl Groups -- Fabulous Females Who Rocked The World, Bloomington, Indiana, Authorhouse Publications. p. 623.  (sc);  (e).

External links

The Chantels
'The Chantels' Vocal Group Hall of Fame Page
History of Rock page on The Chantels
Maybe: My Memoirs

Carlton Records artists
Doo-wop groups
American rhythm and blues musical groups
American girl groups
African-American musical groups
People from the Bronx
Musical groups from the Bronx
Musical groups established in 1957
Musical groups disestablished in 1970
1957 establishments in New York City